TLC India is an Indian television channel, previously known as Discovery Travel & Living. It focuses on lifestyle programmes, with topics such health, cooking and travel.

The channel launched in October 2004 and was the first international channel launched under the "Discovery Travel & Living" name.

The channel features both original productions and imported programmes. The first local original production for the channel was The Great Indian Wedding. The series was produced by Blue Mango Films, a leading non-fiction film company in India. Following its success, the channel has started offering more Indian programming.

On 1 September 2010 Discovery Travel & Living India became TLC. TLC's HD feed was launched on 2 June 2014.

Shows
Programmes shown in the channel include:

Unique Sweets
Gypsy Sisters
Ultimate Cake Off
Man v. Food
Ravinder's Kitchen
Fun Taiwan All-Stars
Gordon's Great Escape
Great Indian Global kitchen
Food Fighters (TV series)
Fast Food Mania
Hell's Kitchen (U.S. TV series)
Planet Food
Bizarre Foods with Andrew Zimmern
Jamie at Home
Nigel Slater's Dish of the Day
World Cafe: Asia
Luke Nguyen's Vietnam
Off Road with Gul Panag 
Chuck's Week Off
Bridget's Sexiest Beaches
Outrageeous Kid Parties
90 Day Fiance
Extreme Couponing
Amazing Eats
The Taste (UK TV series)
Kylie Kwong: My China
Get Out!
Wild Weddings
Jamie's 30 minute meals
Queens of Comedy

See also
TLC (TV network)

References

External links

English-language television stations in India
India
Television channels and stations established in 2004
Television stations in Mumbai